Reginald "Reg" Higgins (11 July 1930, in Widnes – , in Frodsham) was a British international rugby union player.

He was born in Widnes, Lancashire and played as a flanker for Liverpool rugby club. He was capped thirteen times for England between 1954 and 1959. He also took part in the British Lions tour of South Africa, playing in the first test match. Although the Lions won the game 23-22, Higgins was carried off the field with a broken leg.

References

 ESPN Scrum - England/Players and Officials/Reg Higgins

1930 births
1979 deaths
British & Irish Lions rugby union players from England
England international rugby union players
English rugby union players
Lancashire County RFU players
Rugby union players from Widnes